A state mammal is the official mammal of a U.S. state as designated by a state's legislature. The first column of the table is for those denoted as the state mammal, and the second shows the state marine mammals. Animals with more specific designations are also listed. Many states also have separately officially designated state birds, state fish, state butterflies, state reptiles, and other animals. Listed separately are state dogs and state horses.

State mammals
Key: Years in parentheses denote the year of adoption by the state's legislature.

See also
Lists of United States state symbols
Lists of United States state symbols#Flora and fauna
List of U.S. state dogs
List of U.S. state horses

References

External links

Mammals
State